Ryan Moore is a Canadian musician known primarily for his dub project Twilight Circus, his long association with the influential experimental electronic rock band, The Legendary Pink Dots and the Tear Garden.

Early career
He began as a bassist in the Vancouver, British Columbia, Canada music scene in the early 1980s. He was active in the nexus forged between punk rock and reggae, taking inspiration from the DIY ethic, which led him to begin his own label, M Records. In the late 1980s, Moore became part of the Nettwerk Records stable of artists and musicians where he remained for several years, working with numerous artists including Skinny Puppy's side project, Hilt, pop artists Lava Hay, Single Gun Theory,  Sarah McLachlan, and The Final Cut.

In the early 1990s, he relocated to the Netherlands where he joined the Legendary Pink Dots. In addition to a busy schedule of tours and recording with the Legendary Pink Dots, Moore also recorded with the Tear Garden, Edward Ka-Spel, and Skinny Puppy. He also worked with the Canadian producer Darryl Neudorf's Miller Block studio collective, and released the first record in his dub and reggae project Twilight Circus.

In addition to working as a bass player,  Moore toured as a live percussionist with the tribal techno outfit, Exquisite Corpse (from ex-Psychick Warriors ov Gaia member Robert Heynen and Debbie Jones),  playing at clubs on the 1990s UK rave scene including London's Megadog, and Pure at Glasgow Barrowlands.  A 1996 world tour as additional live drummer with the Skinny Puppy offshoot Download saw Moore moving into the role of live drummer, also on later tours and albums with the Legendary Pink Dots.

Since 2000
Since 2001, Ryan Moore has primarily been active with Twilight Circus.  He also produced artists such as Michael Rose (from the Grammy award-winning Black Uhuru), and collaborated with other artists such as DJ Spooky and Cevin Key. With Twilight Circus, Moore has worked with a number of reggae musicians including, Sly Dunbar, Dean Fraser, Big Youth, Gregory Isaacs, Sugar Minott, Chinna Smith, Vin Gordon, and Ansel Collins.

Discography

Twilight Circus
In Dub Vol. 1 (1995)
Other Worlds Of Dub (1996)
Bin Shaker Dub (1997)
Dub Plate Selection (1998)
Horsie (1999)
Dub Plates Volume Two (1999)
Dub Voyage (2000)
Volcanic Dub (2001)
Dub Plates Vol 3 (2002)
The Essential Collection (2002) (compilation)
Foundation Rockers (2003)
Dub From The Secret Vaults (2004)
DJ Spooky That Subliminal Kid vs. Twilight Circus - Riddim Clash (2004)
Remixed: Dubwise (2004)
Remixed: Abstract Beats (2004)
Deeper Roots (2005)
Rasta International (2006)
Cultural Roots Showcase (2007)
Binghi Riddim (2008)
Vocal Anthology Vol 1 (2008)
Dub Plate Style Vol 1 Vinyl EP Track Collection (2012)
Dub Plate Style Vol 2 Vinyl EP Track Collection (2012)
Fleximix Collection 45's Collection (2012)
Extended Disco Mixes (2013)

Legendary Pink Dots
Shadow Weaver
Malachai (Shadow Weaver Part 2)
Nine Lives to Wonder
From Here You'll Watch the World Go By
Hallway of the Gods
Nemesis Online
A Perfect Mystery
Remember Me This Way
Chemical Playschool 8+9
Chemical Playschool 10
Chemical Playschool 11+12+13
Live at the Metro
Farewell, Milky Way
Live in Hildesheim 1991
Live in Montpellier
Canta Mientras Puedas
A Guide to the Legendary Pink Dots Vol. 1: The Best Ballads
El Kaleidoscopio Terminal
I Did Not Inhale
A Guide to the Legendary Pink Dots Vol. 2: Psychedelic Classics and Rarities

Tear Garden
The Last Man to Fly
To Be an Angel Blind, the Crippled Soul Divide
Crystal Mass
Sheila Liked The Rodeo
Bouquet of Black Orchids
For Those Who Would Walk with the Gods
Eye Spy with My Little Eye

Michael Rose
African Roots
African Dub
Warrior
Warrior Dub
Reggae Legend
Showdown In A Bloody Town

Hilt
Orange Pony
Journey to the Center Of the Bowl

Various artists
Twilight Circus Meets cEvin Key - DUBCON - UFO Pon Di Gullyside
Edward Ka-Spel Meets Twilight Circus - 800 Saints In A Day
Gaudi - In Between Times
Animal Slaves - A Fine End
Artwork - Artwork
Brainbox - Primordia
Brothers And Systems - Transcontinental Weekend
Cevin Key - Ghost Of Each Room
Copyright - Circle C
Childman - Childman
Darkstar - Travelogue
Darkstar - Travelogue II
DNA - Le Draw Dee Kee
Dub Project - Dub Project
Dub Project - II
Dubzap - Pro
Dead Voices on Air - Piss Frond
Dead Voices on Air - Live
Edward Ka-Spel - Chyekk China Doll (Reissue)
Edward Ka-Spel - Scriptures Of Illumina
Edward Ka-Spel - Das Digital Vertrauen
The Final Cut - Consumed
Lava Hay - Lava Hay
Lava Hay - With A Picture In Mind
Lydia Tomkiw - Incorporated
Muslimgauze - Mort Aux Vaches
Niels Van Hoorn - Colours
Single Gun Theory - Millions Like Stars In My Hands
Ranking Joe - World In Trouble
Ranking Joe - World In Dub
Tippy Agogo - Holy Crow
Tippy Agogo - Incantos
Uzume Taiko - Chirashi

Remixes
DJ Spooky - Variation Cybernetique Remix
Meat Beat Manifesto - Storm The Dub Mix
Necessary Intergalactic Cooperation - #1 Dub / Norwegian Headcharge
Nirgilis - Remix
Strange Attractor - Rorschach (Twilight Circus Dub Limbo Mix)
Systemwide - Eyupsultan Remix
Vibronics - Jah Light Jah Love Remix
Zion Train - Hailing Up the Selector Remix

Video and DVD

Legendary Pink Dots - Live At La Luna (VHS/DVD)
Legendary Pink Dots - 9 Lives To Wonder - A film by Cevin Key (DVD)

References

External links
Twilightcircus.com

Canadian industrial musicians
Canadian electronic musicians
Musicians from Vancouver
Living people
Year of birth missing (living people)
The Legendary Pink Dots members